Yeşiltepe is a town (belde) and municipality in the Aksaray District, Aksaray Province, Turkey. Its population is 2,276 (2021).

References

Populated places in Aksaray District
Towns in Turkey